Stargazing is the debut studio album by the Italian darkfolk band Søren, released on December 8, 2017 digitally and on December 22, 2017 as a physical record. A music video for the song "Houses" was filmed in January 2018, directed by Antonio La Camera, an Italian filmmaker.

Track listing

Personnel 
The personnel include :-
Matteo Gagliardi − vocals, keyboards, drum programming
Mark Brown - piano
Giulia Cianca - vocals
Diana D'Ascenzo - backing vocals
Stephen K. Donnelly - guitars
Joni Fuller - violin, strings, percussions
Angelo Pagliuca Mena - tambourine and cajon
Matt Le Fevers - guitars
William Stewart - electric violin
Stryfer - bass guitar
Diego Van Cooper - drum programming
Siros Vaziri - drums
Mike Wyatt - guitars
Jung Chin Yeoh - cello
Fabio Fraschini - Mix
Fabrizio De Carolis - Mastering

Stargazing Live!
In 2018 a companion EP to Stargazing titled Stargazing Live! was released with a live recording of the band's performance at ARTEr.i.e. in Cantalupo in Sabina.

Track listing

Personnel 
The personnel include :
 Matteo Gagliardi − vocals
 Flaminia Capitani − vocals, acoustic guitar
 Andrea Aloisi - percussions
 Fabio Fraschini - mix & mastering

References

External links 
 

2017 debut albums
Søren (band) albums